The Third Gerbrandy cabinet, also called the Fourth London cabinet, was the Dutch government-in-exile from 23 February 1945 until 25 June 1945. The cabinet was formed by the political parties Roman Catholic State Party (RKSP), Anti-Revolutionary Party (ARP) and the Free-thinking Democratic League (VDB) following the resignation of the Second Gerbrandy cabinet on 27 January 1945. The national unity government (War cabinet) was the last of four war cabinets of the government-in-exile in London during World War II.

Formation
On 27 January 1945 the Second Gerbrandy cabinet fell after Minister of the Interior Jaap Burger (SDAP) was asked to resign by Prime Minister Pieter Sjoerds Gerbrandy (ARP) after holding a radio speech, differentiating between "wrongful" Dutch civilians (foute Nederlanders) and Dutch civilians who made a mistake (Nederlanders die een fout hebben gemaakt). However, because Pieter Sjoerds Gerbrandy did not discuss this with the rest of the cabinet, all Social Democratic Workers' Party ministers resigned in response. The demissionary cabinet continued until the installation of the Third Gerbrandy cabinet on 23 February 1945.

Term
Although the cabinet was officially seated in London, Minister of the Interior Louis Beel (RKSP) was already present in the earlier liberated southern part of the Netherlands in Oisterwijk, where he introduced a temporary arrangement for municipal and provincial governments after the war. Emergency municipal councils were to be appointed by a separate electoral colleges. An important part of the administrative tasks in the liberated part of the Netherlands is executed under the authority of the Military Command by the Commander-in-chief of the Armed forces General Prince Bernhard of Lippe-Biesterfeld and Major general Henk Kruls.

Cabinet Members

References

External links
Official

  Kabinet-Gerbrandy III Parlement & Politiek

Cabinets of the Netherlands
1945 establishments in the Netherlands
1945 disestablishments in the Netherlands
Cabinets established in 1945
Cabinets disestablished in 1945
Netherlands in World War II
Governments in exile during World War II